Scoriodyta conisalia is a species of moth in the family Psychidae. It was described by Edward Meyrick in 1888. It is endemic to New Zealand.

References

Moths described in 1888
Moths of New Zealand
Psychidae
Endemic fauna of New Zealand
Endemic moths of New Zealand